The Geely HQ ("Haoqing" (豪情)) is a subcompact hatchback  from Chinese manufacturer, Geely Automobile.

Overview

The Geely HQ or Haoqing was the first Geely product, introduced in February 1998 as a hatchback. A special edition 5-door hatchback is also available known as the "Liangjing" as well as station wagon models known as the Geely Pride HQ7130B1U and Geely Pride S-RV. The HQ7130BU was sold from 2002 to 2007, while the S-RV was sold from 2002 to 2005. 

The HQ is based on the G100 Daihatsu Charade platform, which Geely licensed from FAW Tianjin. Its basic underpinnings are shared with the Merrie/Uliou and Rural/Urban Nanny.

The HQ was given an update in 2003 and was shown at the Frankfurt Motor Show in 2005 along with the Geely MR, Geely CK, Geely CD and the Maple Marindo. 

Production ended in 2006.

References

External links
Official website of the HQ

HQ
First car made by manufacturer

2000s cars
Cars introduced in 1998